Enrique Alarcón Sánchez-Manjavacas (1917–1995) was a Spanish art director. He worked on over two hundred films.

Selected filmography

 Eloisa Is Under an Almond Tree (1943)
 The Phantom and Dona Juanita (1945)
 Lady in Ermine (1947)
 The Faith (1947)
 Saturday Night (1950)
 The Girl at the Inn (1951)
 From Madrid to Heaven (1952)
 It Happened in Seville (1955)
 The Lost City (1955)
 Congress in Seville (1955)
 The Sun Comes Out Every Day (1958)
 The Violet Seller (1958)
 The Nightingale in the Mountains (1958)
 A Girl Against Napoleon (1959)
 Alfonso XII and María Cristina (1960)
 Heaven at Home (1960)
 The Fair of the Dove (1963)
 Samba (1965)
 The Lost Woman (1966)
 Road to Rocío (1966)
 The Hunting Party (1971)

References

Bibliography 
 Sally Faulkner. A Cinema of Contradiction: Spanish Film in the 1960s. Edinburgh University Press, 2006.

External links 
 

1917 births
1995 deaths
Spanish art directors

People from the Province of Ciudad Real